Marcia King may refer to:

 Marcia Gygli King (1931–2011), American artist
 Marcia Lenore King (1959–1981), murder victim